The 1972–73 Kentucky Colonels season was the sixth season of the Colonels in the American Basketball Association.

Roster
42 Bill Chamberlain - Small forward
10 Louie Dampier - Point guard
32 Mike Gale - Shooting guard	
53 Artis Gilmore - Center 
44 Dan Issel - Center 
4 Wendell Ladner - Small forward
30 Rick Mount - Shooting guard
3 Jim O'Brien - Point guard
15 Pierre Russell - Shooting guard	
 2 Walt Simon - Small forward 
 8 Ron Thomas - Power forward
24 Claude Virden - Small forward

Final standings

Eastern Division

Playoffs
Eastern Division Semifinals

Colonels win series, 4–1

Eastern Division Finals

Colonels win series, 4–3

ABA Finals

Colonels lose series, 4–3

Awards and honors
1973 ABA All-Star Game selections (game played on February 6, 1973)
Dan Issel 
Louie Dampier 
Artis Gilmore
All ABA-First Team selections
Artis Gilmore
All ABA-Second Team selections
Dan Issel

References

 Colonels on Basketball Reference

External links
 RememberTheABA.com 1972-73 regular season and playoff results
 RememberTheABA.com Kentucky Colonels page

Kentucky Colonels seasons
Kentucky
Kentucky Colonels, 1972-73
Kentucky Colonels, 1972-73